The 2017 Wofford Terriers football team represented Wofford College in the 2017 NCAA Division I FCS football season. They were led by 30th-year head coach Mike Ayers and played their home games at Gibbs Stadium. They were a member of the Southern Conference. They finished the season 10–3, 7–1 in SoCon play to win the SoCon championship. They received the SoCon's automatic bid to the FCS Playoffs where they defeated Furman in the second round before losing in the quarterfinals to the eventual champion North Dakota State.

On December 13, head coach Mike Ayers announced his retirement. He finished at Wofford with a 30-year record of 207–139–1.

Schedule

Source: Schedule

Game summaries

Furman

at Mercer

Gardner–Webb

at Presbyterian

Western Carolina

at The Citadel

Samford

at East Tennessee State

Chattanooga

at VMI

at South Carolina

FCS Playoffs

Furman–Second Round

at North Dakota State–Quarterfinals

Ranking movements

References

Wofford
Wofford Terriers football seasons
Southern Conference football champion seasons
Wofford
Wofford Terriers football